Dagsedlar åt kapitalismen is an album by the Swedish folk singer-songwriter and guitar player Fred Åkerström.

Track listing
 Luffaren
 Balladen om Bror Lundbom
 Varning för hunden
 Kapitalismen
 Två gånger död
 Halleluja amen
 Kapital
 Onkel Sam och den snälle gossen
 Vaggvisa
 För maskens skull
 Prästen och slaven
 Balladen om Joe Hill

External links
 Lyrics

1967 albums
Fred Åkerström albums
Swedish-language albums